Child labor in the United States was a common phenomenon across the economy in the 19th century.  Outside agriculture, it gradually declined in the early 20th century, except in the South which added children in textile and other industries.  Child labor remained common in the agricultural sector until compulsory school laws were enacted by the states. In the North state laws prohibited work in mines and later in factories.  A national law was passed in 1916 but it was overturned by the Supreme Court in 1918. A 1919 law was also overturned.  In the 1920s an effort to pass a constitutional amendement failed, because of opposition from the South and from Catholics. Outside of farming child labor was steadily declining in the 20th century and the New Deal in 1938 finally ended child labor in factories and mines. Child labor has always been a factor in agriculture and that continues into the 21st century.

History

Colonial and early national

In an overwhelmingly rural society, farmers discovered that children as young as six or seven could usefully handle chores assigned along gender lines. In the cities, at a time when schools were uncommon outside New England, girls had household and child care chores while boys at about age 12 were apprenticed to craftsmen.  Colonial America had as surplus of good farmland and a shortage of workers, so criminals in England kidnapped London youth to spirit them away for resale in Virginia. Parliament made it a priority to catch and prosecute offenders.

At the age of 13, orphan children were sent into a trade or domestic work due to laws that sought to prevent idle children from becoming a burden to society. In towns after 1810 or so the apprenticeship system gave way to factory employment for poor children, and school attendance for the middle classes.

New England began to industrialize after 1810, especially with textile mills that hired entire families. After 1840, mills started to shift aways from families, hiring older individuals especially new immigrants from Ireland and Canada.

19th century
As the North industrialized in the first half of the 19th century, factories and mines hired young workers for a variety of tasks. According to the 1900 census, of the children ages ten to fifteen 18 percent were employed: 1,264,000 boys and 486,000 girls. Most worked on family farms. Every decade following 1870, the number of children in the workforce increased, with the percentage not dropping until the 1920s. Especially in textile mills, children were often hired together with both parents and could be hired for only $2 a week. Their parents could both work in the mill and watch their children at the same time. Children had an advantage as their small statures were useful for fixing machinery and squeezing into small spaces. Many families in mill towns depended on the children's labor to make enough money for necessities. In mining towns, many parents often helped their children thwart child laws that did exist since miners were paid per carload of coal and any additional help to move the coal meant an increase in pay.

Farming

The reformers were crusading against factories, which they considered a debilitating to growing children and threatened to damage them permanently. They saw a farm labor as an entirely different matter—indeed, an American ideal. According to activist Alexander McKelway in 1905, open-air farm work was "beneficial in developing a strong physical constitution". Harvest season did not interfere with the scheduled school year, he added, and being under the beneficial and watchful eye of parents strengthened the family.  

Using census data processed by Lee Craig, Robert Whaples concludes for the Midwest in the mid-19th century:

From 1910 to 1920, more than 60 percent of child workers in the United States were employed in agriculture. A son born into a farm family was worth real cash in terms of productivity and needing to hire less outside labor, as well as an heir to the family property. Some children preferred work over school since earning wages earned them respect in their homes, they were punished in the form of corporal punishment at school, and did not like to read or write instead of working.

According to Kent Hendrickson, two New Deal laws had a major impact on sugar beet farming in the Great Plains. The Jones-Costigan Act of 1934 and the Sugar Act of 1937 improved working conditions somewhat. However, they were written primarily to aid the growers and the sugar processing mills. Much of the field work was done by migrant Mexicans, who faced low wages, child labor and poor housing.

Early 20th century

In the early 20th century, opponents of child labor cooperated with other Progressive Era reformers and American Federation of Labor (AFL) unions to organize at the state level. In 1904 a major national organization emerged, the National Child Labor Committee (NCLC). In state after state reformers launched crusades to pass laws restricting child labor, with the ultimate goals of rescuing young bodies and increasing school attendance. The frustrations included the Supreme Court striking down two national laws as unconstitutional, and weak enforcement of state laws that impacted local business.

An effective tool was publicity, especially photographs in muckraking magazines that showed bad working conditions. The most successful of their crusaders was photographer Lewis Hine. In 1908 he became the photographer for the NCLC, which had good contact with the muckraking press. Over the next decade, Hine focused on the negative side of child labor. In the North, reformers were often successful in getting legislation on the books, but were disappointed when enforcement was handled by patronage appointees who proved reluctant to challenge the business community. Meanwhile in the South legislation was opposed by rapidly growing mills that undercut Northern competitors with cheap wages.  Starting in 1898, Montgomery, Alabama, minister Edgar Gardner Murphy crusaded to end child labor across the South but had little success.

In Congress a leading proponent was Senator Albert J. Beveridge Republican of Indiana. He tried—and failed—to get the first national bill passed. Unlike the Republican leadership, the Democratic leadership was not beholden to employers, and thus was more supportive of controls on child labor and other laws promoted by labor unions. Alexander McKelway (1866-1918), a staunch supporter of Woodrow Wilson, campaigned for such laws as the 1916 Keating–Owen Act. The Keating–Owen Act banned child labor but was overturned by the Supreme Court in 1918. A similar 1919 law was also overturned.  In the 1920s an effort to pass a constitutional amendement failed, because of opposition from the South and from Catholics.  The South finally passed compulsory school laws and by the late 1920s children under 15 were rarely hired by mills or factories. Finally in the Fair Labor Standards Act of 1938 the New Deal successfully ended most child labor outside agriculture.

Newsboys sold the latest edition of daily newspapers on the street. They worked as contractors without benefits. Age was a disadvantage as younger boys collected more tips. The newspaper publishers needed their work and editors shielded them from child labor laws while romanticizing their entrepreneurial enterprise and downplaying their squalid life under dangerous conditions.

After 1933: Laws to reduce child labor

The most sweeping federal law that restricts the employment and abuse of child workers is the 1938 Fair Labor Standards Act (FLSA). Its child labor provisions were designed to protect the educational opportunities of youth and prohibit their employment in jobs that are detrimental to their health and safety. FLSA raised the coverage to youth under 18 years of age and lists hazardous occupations too dangerous for them to perform. It does not apply to agricultural workers, which has always been the arena for most child labor.  Under the FLSA, for non-agricultural jobs, children under 14 may not be employed, children between 14 and 16 may be employed in allowed occupations during limited hours, and children between 16 and 17 may be employed for unlimited hours in non-hazardous occupations.

Many of the restrictions were temporarily put on hold in World War II, as enlarging factory employment became a national priority. The number of employed youth, ages 14 to 17, tripled from 870,000 in 1940 to 2.8 million in 1944, as high school enrollment dropped by one million. Motivating factors included patriotism, materialism, and dislike of school. 

In agriculture, studies in the 1960s showed Hispanic and other families employed as farm laborers needed the income generated by their children. However the children showed severe educational retardation.

States have varying laws covering youth employment. Each state has minimum requirements such as earliest age a child may begin working, number of hours a child is allowed to work during the day, number of hours a child is allowed to work during the week. The United States Department of Labor lists the minimum requirements for agricultural work in each state. 

Individual states have a wide range of restrictions on labor by minors, often requiring work permits for minors who are still enrolled in high school, limiting the times and hours that minors can work by age and imposing additional safety regulations.

21st Century
By 2023, states such as New Jersey had loosened child labor restrictions following the lessening of the COVID-19 pandemic severity, with violations increasing nationwide as a tight labor market increased worker demand.

See also
 Child labour for worldwide efforts
 Newspaper hawker includes newsboys
 Newsboys' strike of 1899 in New York City
 Packers Sanitation Services illegal employment of children

Notes

Further reading
 Abbott, Edith. "A study of the early history of child labor in America." American Journal of Sociology 14.1 (1908): 15–37. Based on colonial laws for cities. online

 Felt, Jeremy P. Hostages of Fortune: Child Labor in New York State (1965) online
 Felt, Jeremy P. "The child labor provisions of the Fair Labor Standards Act." Labor History 11.4 (1970): 467-481.

 Firkus, Angela. "At the Factory, on the Street, and in State Institutions: Child Workers of Kansas City at the Turn of the Twentieth Century." Missouri Historical Review (2019) 114#1 pp. 40-63.
 Gordon, Lynn. "Women and the Anti-Child Labor Movement in Illinois, 1890-1920." Social Service Review 51.2 (1977): 228-248. online
 Gratton, Brian, and Jon Moen. "Immigration, Culture, and Child Labor in the United States, 1880-1920." Journal of Interdisciplinary History 34#3 (2004), pp. 355–91. online

  Hindman, Hugh D. Child labor: an American history (M.E. Sharpe, 2002) online; detailed scholarly history.
 Holleran, Philip M. "Family income and child labor in Carolina cotton mills." Social Science History 21.3 (1997): 297-320. DOI: https://doi.org/10.1017/S0145553200017764 

 Kaufka Walts, Katherine. "Child labor trafficking in the United States: A hidden crime." Social Inclusion 5.2 (2017): 59–68.
 Keil, Thomas J., and Wayne M. Usui. "The family wage system in Pennsylvania's anthracite region: 1850–1900." Social Forces 67.1 (1988): 185-207. https://doi.org/10.1093/sf/67.1.185
 Kett, Joseph F. Rites of passage: Adolescence in America, 1790 to the present (1977).

 Kleinberg, S. J. The Shadow of the Mills: Working-Class Families in Pittsburgh, 1870–1907 (U of Pittsburgh Press, 1991) pp 174–196.
 Kleinberg, S. Jay. "Children's and Mothers' Wage Labor in Three Eastern U.S. Cities, 1880-1920" Social Science History (2005) 29(1) DOI:10.1215/01455532-29-1-45

 Landes William and Lewis C. Solomon, “Compulsory Schooling Legislation: An economic Analysis of Law and Social Change in the Nineteenth Century,” Journal of Economic History 22(1), 1972 

 Larner, John William. "The Glass House Boys: Child Labor Conditions in Pittsburgh's Glass Factories, 1890-1917." Western Pennsylvania History (1965): 355-364. online

 Licht, Walter. Getting Work: Philadelphia, 1840-1950 (U of Pennsylvania Press, 2000) statistical data on work vs school, by age, social class and ethnicity.

 Lleras-Muney, Adriana. "Were compulsory attendance and child labor laws effective? An analysis from 1915 to 1939." Journal of Law and Economics 45.2 (2002): 401–435. online

 Mintz, Steven. Huck’s raft: A history of American childhood (Harvard University Press, 2004) pp 133–184. online

 Moehling, Carolyn. “State Child Labor Laws and the Decline of Child Labor.” Explorations in Economic History 36 (1998): 72-106.
 Nasaw, Children of the City: At Work and at Play (1965)  online

 Parsons, Donald O. and Claudia Goldin. “Parental Altruism and Self-Interest: Child Labor among Late Nineteenth-Century American Families.” Economic Inquiry 27#4 (1989): 637-59.
 Rosenberg, Chaim M. Child labor in America: a history (Macfarland, 2013) online; popular history built around Hine photographs.
 Sundue, Sharon Braslaw. Industrious in Their Stations: Young People at Work in Urban America, 1720-1810 (U. of Virginia Press, 2009) also see online review.
 Trattner, Walter I. Crusade for the Children: A History of the National Child Labor Committee and Child Labor Reform in America (1970) online
 Tyler, John H. "Using state child labor laws to identify the effect of school-year work on high school achievement." Journal of Labor Economics 21.2 (2003): 381–408.
 Walker, Roger W. "The AFL and child‐labor legislation: An exercise in frustration." Labor History 11.3 (1970): 323-340.

 Walters, Pamela Barnhouse, and Carl M. Briggs. "The family economy, child labor, and schooling: Evidence from the early twentieth-century South." American Sociological Review (1993): 163-181. online

 West, Elliott. Growing up with the country: Childhood on the far western frontier (UNM Press, 1989).
 Whaples, Robert. "Child labor in the United States." EH. Net Encyclopedia (2005) online

 Wood, Betsy. Upon the Altar of Work: Child Labor and the Rise of a New American Sectionalism (U of Illinois Press, 2020).
 Zelizer, Viviana A. Pricing the priceless child: The changing social value of children (Princeton UP, 1994).

Newsboys

 Adams, Myron E. "Children in American street trades." Annals of the American Academy of Political and Social Science 25.3 (1905): 23-43. online

 DiGirolamo, Vincent, Crying the News: A History of America's Newsboys (Oxford UP, 2019) excerpt
 Goldmark, Josephine C. "Street Labor and Juvenile Delinquency" Political Science Quarterly 19#3 (1904), pp. 417-438 online

 Gowen, Emily. " 'Ain’t Any Chance to Rise in the Paper Business': Horatio Alger, Newsboys, and the Racialization of Poverty." American Literature (2022) https://doi.org/10.1215/00029831-10084512
 Gunckel, John Elstner. Boyville: A History of Fifteen Years' Work Among Newsboys (1905), a primary source online .
 Postol, Todd A. "Creating the American Newspaper Boy: Middle-Class Route Service and Juvenile Salesmanship in the Great Depression." Journal of Social History (1997) 31#2: 327-345. online

 Staller, Karen M. New York's Newsboys: Charles Loring Brace and the Founding of the Children's Aid Society (Oxford UP, 2020).
 Whisnant, David E. "Selling the gospel News, or: The strange career of Jimmy Brown the Newsboy." Journal of Social History 5.3 (1972): 269-309. online
 Zboray, Ronald J., and Mary Saracino Zboray. "The 'Sound of an Extra': Representing Civil War Newsboys by Pen and in Print." American Journalism 36.3 (2019): 348-370.

Farmers

 Baldwin, Bird, et al. Farm Children: Investigation of Rural Child Life in Selected Areas of Iowa (1930)
 Curtiss, Davin C. "The fair labor standards act and child labor in agriculture." Journal of Corporation Law 20 (1994): 303+.
 Fasick, Frank A.  "Educational retardation among children of migratory agricultural workers." Rural Sociology 32.4 (1967): 399.

 "State child labor laws applicable to agricultural employment". Wage and hour division. United States Department of Labor. December 2014.
 Riney-Kehrberg, Pamela. Childhood on the farm: Work, play, and coming of age in the Midwest (University Press of Kansas, 2005).
 Riney-Kehrberg, Pamela. "But What Kind of Work Do the Rest of You Do: Child Labor on Nebraska Farms, 1870-1920." Nebraska History 82.1 (2001): 2-10 online.
 Taylor, Ronald B. Sweatshops in the sun; child labor on the farm (1973), conditions in late 20c for migrant workers excerpt

Historiography and memory

 Austin, Hilary Mac, and Kathleen Thompson. "Historical Thinking: Examining a Photo of Newsboys in Summer, 1908." Social Studies and the Young Learner 27.2 (2014): 29-33. online

 Basu, Kaushik. "Child labor: cause, consequence, and cure, with remarks on international labor standards." Journal of Economic literature 37.3 (1999): 1083–1119. 
 Brooks, John Graham. "Past and Present Arguments Against Child Labor" Annals of the American Academy of Political and Social Science (1906) 27:281+ online

 Cohen, Miriam. "Reconsidering schools and the American welfare state." History of Education Quarterly 45.4 (2005): 511-537.
 Cox, J. Robert. "The rhetoric of child labor reform: An efficacy‐utility analysis." Quarterly Journal of Speech 60.3 (1974): 359-370. online
 Dimock, George. “Children of the Mills: Re-Reading Lewis Hine’s Child-Labour Photographs.” Oxford Art Journal 16#2, (1993), pp. 37–54. online

 Lindenmeyer, Kriste. "An historical perspective on child labor in the United States." Employee Responsibilities and Rights Journal 18.2 (2006): 133-142.
 McAhren, Robert Willard. "Making the Nation Safe for Childhood: A History of the Movement for Federal Regulation of Child Labor, 1900 - 1938 (PhD dissertation, U of Texas, 1967. ProQuest Dissertations Publishing, 1967. 6708129).

Primary sources

 Abbott, Grace, ed. The Child and the State: Volume I: Legal Status in the Family Apprenticeship and Child Labor: Select Documents, with Introductory Notes (U of Chicago Press, 1938). 
 Abbott, Grace, ed. The Child and the State: Volume II: The Dependent and the Delinquent Child; The Child of Unmarried Parents: Select Documents, with Introductory Notes (U of Chicago Press, 1947) 
 Annals of the American Academy of Political and Social Science Volume 27 Issue 2, (March 1906) online

 Bremner, Robert H., ed. Children and youth in America: A documentary history (3 vol, in 5 books, (Harvard University Press, 1971), esp. vol 2.1 pp 601–750. online

 Gompers, Samuel. "Organized Labor's Attitude Toward Child Labor" Annals of the American Academy of Political and Social Science  Volume 27, Issue 2 pp 337+ https://doi.org/10.1177/000271620602700211

 Johnsen, Julia E. ed. Selected articles on child labor (1925) online

 Macieski, Robert. Picturing class: Lewis W. Hine photographs child labor in New England (2015) online

External links
"The History of Child Labor in the United States: Hammer v. Dagenhart" Curriculum Unit 04.01.08 by Sharron Solomon-McCarthy; Curriculum Units by Fellows of the Yale-New Haven Teachers Institute (2004) Middle school teaching package.

United States labor law